5 South African Infantry Battalion is a motorised infantry unit of the South African Army.

History

Based in Ladysmith
5 SAI was established on 1 January 1962, at  Ladysmith, Natal Province. The battalion became operational on 1 April 1962.

The Insizwa Proficiency

5 SAI had a very unusual proficiency in the 1970s and 1980s, called the Insizwa, the Zulu word for a strong young man. The criteria required that only sharpshooters on a tabel 4 level were allowed to compete. A  run had to be done under ten mins with battle kit on, followed by  route march also with battle kit. The route march would end at the  firing line where the competitor would have to shoot 8 shots in the bull. The soldier would also have to successfully complete all other shooting exercises with an 80% success rate.

Bushwar
5 SAI took part in Operation Savannah during 1975 in Angola, and Operation Protea in 1981 where it deployed companies continuously on rotation to the operational area, taking part in many of the large operations across the border into Angola in the years which followed, right up to the withdrawal of South African forces from Namibia in 1989.

Training Area
Land to the east of Ladysmith was allocated by the Department of Defence in 1990 as the Boschhoek Training Area.

Peacekeeping operations
In 2004, the battalion was one of several South African units who took part as peacekeepers in the United Nations Mission to the Democratic Republic of Congo (MONUC). The battalion was deployed again in May 2014 to the eastern Democratic Republic of Congo as part of the United Nations Force Intervention Brigade.

SANDF's Motorised Infantry

SANDF's Motorised Infantry is transported mostly by Samil trucks, Mamba APC's or other un-protected motor vehicles. Samil 20,50 and 100 trucks transport soldiers, towing guns, and carrying equipment and supplies. Samil trucks are all-wheel drive, in order to have vehicles that function reliably in extremes of weather and terrain. Motorised infantry have an advantage in mobility allowing them to move to critical sectors of the battlefield faster, allowing better response to enemy movements, as well as the ability to outmaneuver the enemy.

Insignia

Previous Dress Insignia

Current Dress Insignia

Leadership

Notes

References 

Infantry battalions of South Africa
Infantry regiments of South Africa
Military units and formations established in 1962
United Nations Force Intervention Brigade